Michelle A. MacPherson (born May 11, 1966), also known by her married name Michelle Hojnacki, is a former backstroke and butterfly swimmer from Canada.  After being selected for the Canadian Olympic swim team for the 1980 Summer Olympics in Moscow, MacPherson was unable to participate because of the United States-led boycott of the Moscow Olympics.  Four years later, she represented Canada at the 1984 Summer Olympics in Los Angeles, California.  There McPherson won a bronze medal in the women's 4×100-metre medley relay, alongside Canadian teammates Anne Ottenbrite, Reema Abdo and Pamela Rai.

See also
 List of Olympic medalists in swimming (women)

External links
  (archive)
 
 
 

1966 births
Living people
Canadian female backstroke swimmers
Canadian female butterfly swimmers
Olympic bronze medalists for Canada
Olympic bronze medalists in swimming
Olympic swimmers of Canada
Pan American Games bronze medalists for Canada
Pan American Games silver medalists for Canada
Swimmers from Toronto
Swimmers at the 1982 Commonwealth Games
Swimmers at the 1983 Pan American Games
Swimmers at the 1984 Summer Olympics
Swimmers at the 1986 Commonwealth Games
Medalists at the 1984 Summer Olympics
Commonwealth Games medallists in swimming
Commonwealth Games gold medallists for Canada
Commonwealth Games bronze medallists for Canada
Pan American Games medalists in swimming
Medalists at the 1983 Pan American Games
20th-century Canadian women
Medallists at the 1982 Commonwealth Games